Ronald Lawrence Morisco-Tarr, known as Ron Tarr (14 November 1936 – 20 October 1997) was a British actor who played minor roles in television series and films.

His first acting role was in the film Carry On Girls in 1973 where he played an uncredited role as a Bearded Audience Member. This was followed by appearances in many television series such as Doctor Who, Blake's 7, Are You Being Served?, Return of the Saint, The Gentle Touch, The Comic Strip Presents - (Five Go Mad in Dorset, South Atlantic Raiders), Dear John and Dramarama. He also appeared in films such as the James Bond film A View to a Kill (1985), Eat the Rich (1987) and Willow (1988).

He was perhaps best known as the background character Big Ron in the BBC soap opera EastEnders. He played the role of Big Ron from the show's inception in 1985 to just before his death in October 1997. His character had very few central storylines but was often seen interacting with the main characters in the show. After his death, he appeared in pre-recorded episodes that he had filmed before his death. To explain the absence of his character, in early 1998 his character was written out of the series in a storyline in which Big Ron won the lottery and moved to Spain.

Tarr also appeared in a series of 1980s television advertisements for Do it All, a now-defunct DIY chain in the United Kingdom.

On 20 October 1997, Tarr died of cancer aged 60. He was a market trader in his off-screen life, running a stall in Southall market selling household appliance spares.

Filmography

References

External links 
 

1936 births
1997 deaths
English male soap opera actors
Deaths from cancer in England
English male film actors
20th-century English male actors